Tao Jiali (born 1986) is a Chinese fighter pilot in the People's Liberation Army Air Force.

She was one of 35 high school students selected to join the People's Liberation Army Air Force as cadet pilots in July 2005, and after four years of training at Aviation University and flight school, she was among 16 young women who graduated as fighter pilots.

References

 
 

1986 births
Women aviators
Living people
Chinese aviators
Chinese women aviators